Frederick Davison may refer to:

 Frederick Corbet Davison (1929–2004), president of the University of Georgia
 F. Trubee Davison (1896–1974), New York State Representative, Assistant US Secretary of War

See also
Frederick Davidson (1865–1935), mayor of Winnipeg
David Frederick Case (1932–2005), audiobook narrator who used the alias Frederick Davidson